The Cathedral of Our Lady of Victory is a Catholic cathedral and parish church located in Victoria, Texas, United States. It is the seat of the Diocese of Victoria in Texas.

History
Our Lady of Victory Parish can trace its roots to 1956 when the families of Thomas O'Connor Sr. and Martin O'Connor donated  of land for a new Catholic parish. The cornerstone for the present church was laid on April 7, 1957, by Archbishop Robert E. Lucey of San Antonio and it was consecrated on November 4 the following year. Our Lady of Victory Catholic School opened in September 1957. Currently, the school has grade levels ranging from 3k to 8th grade. The school celebrated its 65th anniversary in 2022.

The initial planning for the parish and the construction of the buildings was done by Msgr. Frederick O'Beck who was the pastor at St. Mary's in Victoria. The Rev. Henry Rolf was named the first pastor on July 12, 1958. The parish was officially established the following day.

Pope John Paul II established the Diocese of Victoria in Texas on April 13, 1982. Our Lady of Victory became the cathedral for the diocese at that time.

In 2009 the parish acquired the former Town Plaza Mall located next door to the parish property. The former J.C. Penney store was converted into the Cathedral Center. It houses the parish hall and meeting rooms that are used for receptions, conferences, and various parish programs. Victoria architectural firm Rawley McCoy & Associates was the architect for the project that was completed in 2017. The rest of the mall was sold to the University of Houston–Victoria the same year. A driveway and green space will separate the parish building from the university's facility.

The cathedral suffered water damage during Hurricane Harvey in 2017. Repairs to the roof and the wooden rafters were made at that time. In the summer of 2019, the cathedral was closed for interior renovations necessitated by the water damage from the hurricane. The work included the removal of the murals near the ceiling that had to be re-created on new panels. Other projects included refurbishing the pews, reconditioning the statues, cleaning the walls of mold, restoring the interior woodwork, and repainting the walls while maintaining the integrity of the original murals.

See also
List of Catholic cathedrals in the United States
List of cathedrals in the United States

References

External links

Cathedral Website
Diocese of Victoria Website

Christian organizations established in 1958
Roman Catholic churches completed in 1958
Our Lady of Victory
Modernist architecture in Texas
Churches in Victoria County, Texas
1958 establishments in Texas
20th-century Roman Catholic church buildings in the United States